This is a list of two-dimensional geometric shapes in Euclidean and other geometries. For mathematical objects in more dimensions, see list of mathematical shapes. For a broader scope, see list of shapes.

Generally composed of straight line segments

 Angle
 Balbis
 Concave polygon
 Constructible polygon
 Convex polygon
 Cyclic polygon
 Equiangular polygon
 Equilateral polygon
 Penrose tile
 Polyform
 Regular polygon
 Simple polygon
 Tangential polygon

Polygons with specific numbers of sides
 Henagon – 1 side
 Digon – 2 sides
 Triangle – 3 sides
 Acute triangle
 Equilateral triangle
 Heptagonal triangle
 Isosceles triangle
 Golden Triangle
 Obtuse triangle
 Rational triangle
 Right triangle
 30-60-90 triangle
 Isosceles right triangle
 Kepler triangle
 Scalene triangle
 Quadrilateral – 4 sides
Cyclic quadrilateral
 Kite
 Parallelogram
 Rhombus (equilateral parallelogram)
 Lozenge
 Rhomboid
 Rectangle
 Square (regular quadrilateral)
 Tangential quadrilateral
 Trapezoid
 Isosceles trapezoid
 Pentagon – 5 sides
 Hexagon – 6 sides
 Lemoine hexagon
 Heptagon – 7 sides
 Octagon – 8 sides
 Nonagon – 9 sides
 Decagon – 10 sides
 Hendecagon – 11 sides
 Dodecagon – 12 sides
 Tridecagon – 13 sides
 Tetradecagon – 14 sides
 Pentadecagon – 15 sides
 Hexadecagon – 16 sides
 Heptadecagon – 17 sides
 Octadecagon – 18 sides
 Enneadecagon – 19 sides
 Icosagon – 20 sides
 Icosikaihenagon - 21 sides
 Icosikaidigon - 22 sides
 Icositrigon - 23 sides
 Icositetragon - 24 sides
 Icosikaipentagon - 25 sides
 Icosikaihexagon - 26 sides
 Icosikaiheptagon - 27 sides
 Icosikaioctagon - 28 sides
 Icosikaienneagon - 29 sides
 Triacontagon - 30 sides
 Tetracontagon - 40 sides
 Pentacontagon - 50 sides
 Hexacontagon - 60 sides
 Heptacontagon - 70 sides
 Octacontagon - 80 sides
 Enneacontagon - 90 sides
 Hectogon - 100 sides
 Dihectogon - 200 sides
 Trihectogon - 300 sides
 Tetrahectogon - 400 sides
 Pentahectogon - 500 sides
 Hexahectogon - 600 sides
 Heptahectogon - 700 sides
 Octahectogon - 800 sides
 Enneahectogon - 900 sides
 Chiliagon - 1,000 sides
 Myriagon - 10,000 sides
 Megagon - 1,000,000 sides
 Star polygon – there are multiple types of stars
 Pentagram - star polygon with 5 sides
 Hexagram – star polygon with 6 sides
 Star of David (example)
 Heptagram – star polygon with 7 sides
 Octagram – star polygon with 8 sides
 Star of Lakshmi (example)
 Enneagram - star polygon with 9 sides
 Decagram - star polygon with 10 sides
 Hendecagram - star polygon with 11 sides
 Dodecagram - star polygon with 12 sides
 Apeirogon - generalized polygon with countably infinite set of sides

Curved

Composed of circular arcs
 Annulus
 Arbelos
 Circle
 Archimedes' twin circles
 Bankoff circle
 Circular triangle
 Reuleaux triangle
 Circumcircle
 Disc
 Incircle and excircles of a triangle
 Nine-point circle
 Circular sector
 Circular segment
 Crescent
 Lens, vesica piscis (fish bladder)
 Lune
 Quatrefoil
 Reuleaux polygon
 Reuleaux triangle
 Salinon
 Semicircle
 Tomahawk
 Trefoil
 Triquetra
 Heart

Not composed of circular arcs
 Archimedean spiral
 Astroid
 Cardioid
 Deltoid
 Ellipse

 Heartagon
 Various lemniscates
 Oval
 Cartesian oval
 Cassini oval
 Oval of Booth
 Ovoid – similar to an oval
 Superellipse
 Taijitu
 Tomoe
 Magatama

See also
List of triangle topics
List of circle topics
Glossary of shapes with metaphorical names

References

2
two-dimensional

ar:قائمة الأشكال الهندسية
it:Elenco strutturato di forme geometriche
sv:Geometrisk figur